Maria Anna of Saxony can refer to:
 Maria Anna Sophia of Saxony (1728–1797), wife of Maximilian III Joseph, Elector of Bavaria
 Princess Maria Anna of Saxony (1799–1832), Grand Duchess of Tuscany
 Princess Marie Anne of Saxe-Altenburg (1864–1918), Princess of Schaumburg-Lippe

See also 
 Anna of Saxony (disambiguation)
 
 Princess Marie of Saxe-Altenburg (disambiguation)
 Princess Marie of Saxe-Weimar-Eisenach (disambiguation)
 Maria Amalia of Saxony (1724–1760), Queen of Naples and Sicily (1738-1759), Queen of Spain (1759-1760)
 Marie of Romania, née Marie of Saxe-Coburg-Gotha (1875-1938), Queen of Romania